Alan Forsyth (born 5 April 1992) is a Scottish field hockey player who plays as a forward for HGC and the Scotland and Great Britain national teams.

He is the son of Derek Forsyth, the head coach of Scotland.

Club career
Forsyth plays club hockey in the Dutch Hoofdklasse for Dutch club HGC.

He has been playing since 2014 in the Men's England Hockey League Premier Division for Surbiton.

He also played for Scottish club Kelburne Hockey Club.

International career
Forsyth made his senior international debut for Scotland in 2009 and as at 25 August 2019 he has scored 83 goals in 138 matches. He has competed in the Commonwealth Games in Delhi in 2010, Glasgow in 2014 & Gold Coast in 2018. He made his senior international debut for Great Britain on 19 October 2015. In August 2019, he was selected in the Scotland squad for the 2019 EuroHockey Championship.

Honours & achievements

Individual
  Investec Men's Hockey League Player of the Season.
 UK hockey player of the year award for 2018, following the annual poll by the Hockey Writers’ Club.

References

External links

1992 births
Living people
People from Paisley, Renfrewshire
Male field hockey forwards
British male field hockey players
Scottish male field hockey players
Surbiton Hockey Club players
Men's England Hockey League players
Field hockey players at the 2020 Summer Olympics
Olympic field hockey players of Great Britain
Men's Hoofdklasse Hockey players
HGC players